The Department of Archaeology at the University of York, England, is a department which provides undergraduate and postgraduate courses in archaeology and its sub-disciplines and conducts associated research. It was founded in 1978 and has grown from a small department based at Micklegate House to more than a hundred undergraduate students based at King's Manor and with scientific facilities at the BioArCh centre on the main campus.

Hosted organisations, research specialities and fieldwork

The archaeology department hosts several specialist organisations:
Archaeology Data Service - an open access digital archive for archaeological research outputs
Internet Archaeology - a fully peer-reviewed electronic journal for archaeology
BioArCh - a specialist centre using scientific and molecular techniques for archaeology
York Experimental Archaeology Research (YEAR) Centre
Centre for Digital Heritage - an interdisciplinary centre studying computer-based approaches to heritage. Working with the universities of Aarhus (Denmark), Leiden (Netherlands), Lund (Sweden), Uppsala (Sweden).
The Post Hole -  is an archaeology journal run by students.

The department's faculty has led significant archaeological investigations across Great Britain and occasionally further afield

History

The department opened in 1978, 15 years after the university itself. The first head of department, Philip Rahtz built a thematic undergraduate programme specialising in the British Middle Ages. The programme included a 12-week field course in archaeological excavation. The department expanded under Martin Carver after his appointment in 1986. A postgraduate programme was added and the department moved to King's Manor. Subsequently, the department has grown in numbers of students, staff and the diversity of its specialisms: adding environmental archaeology, prehistory, computational archaeology, archaeological science and cultural heritage management.

Academics
Head of Department:
Nicky Milner
Deputy Heads of Department:
Oliver Craig
Stephanie Wynne-Jones

Other academics:

Michelle Alexander
Ian Armit
Steve Ashby
Penny Bickle
Gill Chitty
Samuel Cobb
Lu Cooke
Phil Cox
Oliver Craig
Gareth Dean
Jonathan Finch
Laura Fitton
Kate Giles
Dawn Hadley
Jessica Hendy
Don Henson
Malin Holst
Matt Jenkins
Jim Leary
Aimée Little
Aleksandra McClain
Nicky Milner
Colleen Morgan
Paul O'Higgins
David Orton
Stephanie Piper
Paola Ponce
Julian D. Richards
Steve Roskams
John Schofield
Dav Smith
Penny Spikins
Daryl Stump
Alice Toso
Nathan Wales
Kevin Walsh

Honorary and visiting staff:
Joann Fletcher
Terry O'Connor
Dominic Powlesland

Former academics
Heads of department:
Philip Rahtz - 1978-1986
Martin Carver - 1986-1996

Jane Grenville - 2001-2006
Julian D. Richards - 2006-2012
John Schofield - 2011-2018
Sara Perry - left 2019

Alumni
 Ken Dark, archaeologist : BA Archaeology, 1982
 Helen Geake, archaeologist : DPhil Archaeology, 1991
 Roberta Gilchrist, archaeologist : DPhil Archaeology, 1989
Greg Jenner - Historical Consultant to CBBC's multi-award-winning 'Horrible Histories'
 Leen Ritmeyer, archaeologist : MA Conservation Studies
 Ben Robinson, The Flying Archaeologist   (BBC Series) : PhD Archaeology

Rankings and awards
Amongst archaeology departments, York ranked 2nd for Impact, 2nd equal for Environment, and 4th overall in the 2014 Research Assessment Exercise. In the 2015 University Subject Tables, the department was ranked 6th out of 40 with a score of 92.6%. The Department was awarded the Queen’s Anniversary Prize for Higher and Further Education in 2011

References

External links
 Department of Archaeology Home Page
 Twitter
 Facebook page
 The Posthole
 Internet Archaeology
 Archaeology Data Service

Departments of the University of York
History education
History institutes
Archaeological research institutes